Ali Palang (also Romanized as ‘Alī Palang) is a village in Doruneh Rural District, Anabad District, Bardaskan County, Razavi Khorasan Province, Iran. At the 2006 census, its population was 24, in 6 families.

See also 

 List of cities, towns and villages in Razavi Khorasan Province

References 

Populated places in Bardaskan County